The Iberian nase (Pseudochondrostoma polylepis) is a species of freshwater fish in the family Cyprinidae.
It is found in Portugal and in Spain. Its natural habitats are rivers and intermittent rivers.

References

 

Pseudochondrostoma
Fish described in 1864
Taxonomy articles created by Polbot
Freshwater fish of Europe
Endemic fish of the Iberian Peninsula
Fauna of Spain
Fauna of Portugal